The 2022 European Masters (officially the 2022 BetVictor European Masters) was a professional snooker tournament that took place from 16 to 21 August 2022 at the Stadthalle Fürth in Fürth, Germany. Broadcast on Eurosport and other networks worldwide, the tournament was the second ranking event of the 2022–23 season and the second of eight tournaments in the season's BetVictor Series. The 24th edition of the European Masters, it was the second staging of the event in 2022 after the previous event in February. It featured a total prize fund of £427,000, of which the winner received £80,000.

The defending champion was Fan Zhengyi, who defeated Ronnie O'Sullivan 10–9 in the final of the tournament's previous edition. However, Fan lost 1–5 to Michael Judge in his held-over qualifying match. O'Sullivan, the reigning world champion and world number one, withdrew from the event for medical reasons. Kyren Wilson defeated Barry Hawkins 9–3 in the final to win the fifth ranking title of his career. The highest break prize was shared by Zhang Anda and Hossein Vafaei, both of whom made maximum breaks in the qualifying round.

Format

The 2022 European Masters was a professional ranking snooker tournament played between 16 and 21 August 2022 at the Stadthalle Fürth in Germany. The second ranking event of the 2022–23 season, it followed the Championship League and preceded the British Open. The second of eight tournaments in the season's BetVictor Series, it was the 24th edition of the European Masters tournament, the first having been held as the European Open in 1989. It was the second staging of the European Masters in 2022; the previous tournament, held in February 2022, was won by Fan Zhengyi, who defeated Ronnie O'Sullivan 10–9 in the final. Matches at the event were played as the best of nine  until the semi-finals, which were best of 11. The final was a best-of-17-frame match played over two . The event was broadcast on Eurosport across Europe. In China, the event was broadcast on Liaoning TV, Superstar Online, Migu, Youku and Huya Live. In all other locations, the event was broadcast on Matchroom Sport.

Prize fund
The event featured a prize fund of £427,000, with the winner receiving £80,000. The breakdown of prize money for this event is shown below:

 Winner: £80,000
 Runner-up: £35,000
 Semi-final: £17,500
 Quarter-final: £11,000
 Last 16: £7,500
 Last 32: £4,500
 Last 64: £3,000
 Highest break: £5,000
 Total: £427,000

Summary

Qualifying round 
Qualifiers for the tournament were held from 15 to 17 July and 22 to 24 July 2022 at the Morningside Arena in Leicester, although qualifying matches featuring the defending champion, Fan Zhengyi, and those involving Mark Selby and Judd Trump, were held over to be played in Fürth. World number one Ronnie O'Sullivan also had his qualifying match held over, but he withdrew for medical reasons a week before the tournament and was replaced in the draw by Luke Simmonds.

On 16 July, Zhang Anda made a maximum break during his 5–1 win over Anton Kazakov; the following day, Hossein Vafaei made a maximum as he defeated Ng On-yee by the same score. It was the first time either player had made a 147 in professional competition. World number five John Higgins lost his qualifying match 3–5 to his Scottish compatriot Scott Donaldson. World number 14 Mark Allen lost 3–5 to amateur player Farakh Ajaib, while world number 19 David Gilbert lost 1–5 to Marco Fu and world number 21 Matthew Selt lost 1–5 to another amateur player, Haydon Pinhey. Jimmy Robertson came from 0–4 behind to defeat Zhao Jianbo 5–4, while Jimmy White came from 0–3 behind to defeat Andrew Pagett 5–4, his first professional victory since the 2021 British Open the previous August. Seven-time world champion Stephen Hendry was whitewashed 0–5 by Mark Joyce.

Early rounds 
The opening round and held-over qualifying matches were played on 16 and 17 August. The defending champion Fan lost 1–5 to Michael Judge in his held-over qualifying match. World number three Selby lost his held-over qualifier 2–5 to Yuan Sijun, despite making a 137 break. World number two Trump played his held-over qualifier in a waistcoat borrowed from Xiao Guodong after his luggage did not arrive in Fürth; he defeated Noppon Saengkham 5–2.

Li Hang, Chang Bingyu, and Lei Peifan were forced to withdraw from the tournament due to visa issues; their last-64 opponents, Zhao Xintong, Scott Donaldson, and Marco Fu, received byes to the last 32. Vafaei also had visa issues but did not formally withdraw from the tournament. After he failed to appear at the venue, his opponent Xiao was awarded a 5–0 win. Luca Brecel lost 1–5 in the last 64 to 18-year-old Chinese player Wu Yize, while Graeme Dott lost 4–5 to Zhou Yuelong and world number 18 Anthony McGill lost 2–5 to Si Jiahui.

The second round, featuring the remaining 32 players, was played on 18 August. Ali Carter defeated Stuart Bingham 5–4, after Bingham came from 1–4 behind to force a deciding frame. Trump defeated Andrew Higginson 5–3, while Shaun Murphy defeated Chris Wakelin by the same score to set up a last-16 meeting with Wilson, who defeated Jimmy Robertson 5–2. Mark Williams defeated his Welsh compatriot Dominic Dale 5–3, while Zhou Yuelong defeated Jack Lisowski 5–1. Yan Bingtao reached the last 16 by whitewashing Ricky Walden 5–0.

The third round consisted of the last 16 players and was contested on 19 August. Ajaib went  whilst escaping from one of Trump's snookers, allowing Trump to win the match 5–4. Carter defeated David Grace, also in a deciding frame, while Wu beat Ryan Day 5–2. Wilson reached the quarter-finals with a 5–3 defeat of Murphy, while Si defeated Daniel Wells in a decider. Williams and Barry Hawkins reached the quarter-finals with 5–0 whitewash wins over Zhou and Robert Milkins respectively. Jamie Jones defeated Yan 5–3.

Later rounds 
The quarter-finals were also played on 19 August. Williams defeated another Welsh compatriot Jones 5–1, making two centuries and three half-centuries in the match. Hawkins came from 2–3 behind against Trump to win three consecutive frames with breaks of 129, 110, and 92 for a 5–3 victory. It was the third successive time Hawkins had defeated Trump, following the 2021 Tour Championship and the 2022 Masters. Trump's quarter-final loss meant that O'Sullivan retained the world number one position; Trump had needed to reach the final to secure the top spot in the world rankings. In the other quarter-finals, Carter defeated Wu 5–3 while Wilson defeated Si 5–2.

The semi-finals were played on 20 August as the best-of-11 frames. Carter then won three consecutive frames to lead 5–4, before Wilson made a 75 break to force a deciding frame, which he won to reach the 12th ranking final of his career. In the other semi-final, Hawkins and Williams were tied at 2–2 at the mid-session interval, but Hawkins then won four consecutive frames with breaks of 67, 89, 131, and 79 to clinch the match 6–2.

Hawkins and Wilson contested the best-of-17-frame final on 21 August. The two players had previously contested the final of the 2019 Paul Hunter Classic at the same venue, with Hawkins winning 4–3 on that occasion. Wilson took a 3–1 lead at the mid-session interval, and led 6–2 after the first session. He went on to win three of the four frames played in the evening session to clinch the match 9–3 and claim the fifth ranking title of his professional career. It was Hawkins's fourth consecutive loss in a ranking final. Both players commented that they had underperformed during the final. Runner-up Hawkins said he was "disappointed" and that the match had been a "struggle all day", whilst Wilson said "we both lost our timing today". In winning the event, Wilson progressed from eighth to sixth in the world snooker rankings.

Main draw 
The draw for the tournament is shown below. Numbers in brackets were players seedings, whilst players in bold denote match winners.

Top half

Bottom half

Final

Qualifying 
Qualifying for the event took place between 15 and 17, and 22 and 24 July 2022 at the Morningside Arena in Leicester, England. Matches involving the defending champion and the top three ranked players were held over and played at the Stadthalle Fürth in Fürth. Ronnie O'Sullivan was originally due to have his match against Sean O'Sullivan held-over but withdrew from the event. The match was still held over as he was replaced by Luke Simmonds.

 1–5 
 5–3 
 5–1 
 5–2 

 3–5 
 5–1 
 5–4 
 5–4 
 4–5 
 1–5 
 5–3 
 2–5 
 5–4 
 1–5 
 5–2 
 3–5 
 1–5 
 5–3 
 3–5 
 5–1 
 5–3 
 1–5 
 5–4 
 1–5 
 5–0 
 3–5 
 5–3 
 5–2 
 0–5 
 4–5 
 2–5 

 5–1 
 3–5 
 5–2 
 3–5 
 5–1 
 1–5 
 5–0 
 2–5 
 5–4 
 1–5 
 5–1 
 3–5 
 5–0 
 3–5 
 5–2 
 5–4 
 4–5 
 3–5 
 5–4 
 5–1 
 4–5 
 5–4 
 5–0 
 5–1 
 5–1 
 1–5 
 5–2 
 5–2 
 5–2 
 5–0

Century breaks

Main stage centuries
49 century breaks were made during the main stage of the tournament. Zhang made the highest break of the event, a 143 in frame seven of his second round match with Murphy.

 143  Zhang Anda
 137  Mark Selby
 136, 117  Stuart Bingham
 136  Jimmy Robertson
 135, 123, 103, 100  Mark Williams
 134, 132, 131, 129, 114, 110, 104, 100  Barry Hawkins
 134, 104, 102  Ryan Day
 128, 120, 103, 102, 100  Ali Carter
 128, 102  Jamie Jones
 120, 104  David Grace
 118, 103, 102  Judd Trump
 117  Oliver Lines
 117  Anthony McGill
 113  Si Jiahui
 112  Chris Wakelin
 111, 101, 101, 100  Kyren Wilson
 109, 108, 101  Wu Yize
 106  Zhou Yuelong
 104  Sean O'Sullivan
 103  Noppon Saengkham
 102  Jak Jones
 102  Yan Bingtao
 100  Michael Judge

Qualifying stage centuries
A total of 32 century breaks were made during the qualifying stage of the tournament. Both Vafaei and Zhang made maximum breaks for the first time in their careers during qualification.

 147  Hossein Vafaei
 147  Zhang Anda
 138  Barry Pinches
 137  Lyu Haotian
 136  Jack Lisowski
 135  Ryan Day
 134  Jamie Jones
 133  Jimmy White
 132  Zhao Xintong
 130  Jamie Clarke
 126  Tom Ford
 123  Chris Wakelin
 118  Andrew Higginson
 115, 106, 103, 103  Xiao Guodong
 115  Jordan Brown
 115  Marco Fu
 110, 100  Li Hang
 107, 105  Stephen Maguire
 106  Barry Hawkins
 105  Mark Williams
 103  Gerard Greene
 102  Aaron Hill
 102  Florian Nüßle
 101  John Higgins
 101  Zhou Yuelong
 100  Liam Highfield
 100  Kyren Wilson

Notes

References

See also

2022
European Masters (2)
European Masters (2)
European Masters
Snooker competitions in Germany
European Series